
Gmina Nowe Miasteczko is an urban-rural gmina (administrative district) in Nowa Sól County, Lubusz Voivodeship, in western Poland.

Villages
Apart from the town of Nowe Miasteczko, Gmina Nowe Miasteczko contains the villages and settlements of Borów Polski, Borów Wielki, Gołaszyn, Konin, Miłaków, Nieciecz, Popęszyce, Rejów, Szyba and Żuków.

Neighbouring gminas
Gmina Nowe Miasteczko is bordered by the gminas of Bytom Odrzański, Kożuchów, Niegosławice, Nowa Sól and Szprotawa.

Twin towns – sister cities

Gmina Nowe Miasteczko is twinned with:
 Bad Liebenwerda, Germany
 Storkow, Germany

References

Nowe Miasteczko
Nowa Sól County